K36DU, UHF analog channel 36, was a low-power Worship Network-affiliated television station licensed to Lake Havasu City, Arizona, United States. The station was owned by Richard D. Tatham.

History
K36DU was founded on March 4, 1994 with an original construction permit granted to Richard D. Tatham of Lake Havasu City. The station was licensed on April 5, 1996 and converted to Class A status on September 10, 2001. The station surrendered its class A license to the Federal Communications Commission (FCC) on April 8, 2013, and reverted to a standard low-power license.

K36DU's license was cancelled by the FCC on August 4, 2021, due to the station failing to obtain a license for digital operation by the July 13 deadline.

Programming
The station broadcast mainly television programming from The Worship Network. K36DU also broadcast at least three hours a week of locally produced programming, plus children's programming. In addition to Worship Network programming, the station also displayed a community bulletin board (CBB).

References 

Religious television stations in the United States
36DU
Lake Havasu City, Arizona
Television channels and stations established in 1996
1996 establishments in Arizona
Defunct television stations in the United States
Television channels and stations disestablished in 2021
2021 disestablishments in Arizona
36DU